Jarmila Loukotková (14 April 1923 – 29 October 2007) was a Czech writer who was born in Prague, Czechoslovakia. 
Her father was Čestmír Loukotka.

Works
Loukotková wrote a number of historical prose focused on antiquity and the Middle Ages. Some of her prose works (eg. Spartacus) show an ideological tendency, but most of them can be said to strive for high-quality historical fiction, which does not ignore reality and historical facts, although it treats them in a fictional way.

Jasmín, 1940
Příběhy kaštanu, 1944 
Fialinka, 1948
Není římského lidu, 1949
Na život se jen čeká, 1961 
Tajemství Černého lesa, 1965 
Liána smrti, 1968
Pro koho krev, 1968 
Vstup do ráje zakázán, 1969
Medúza, 1973 
Dar jitra prvního, 1971
Odměna, 1975
Pod maskou smích, 1977
Doma lidé umírají, 1981
 Žít jednou spolu, 1988
Lhůta prošla, 1992
Křik neviditelných pávů, 1997 
Liána smrti, 2000

External links
Jarmila Loukotkova obituary (German)

1923 births
2007 deaths
Writers from Prague

Czech women writers